Fréchou is a commune in the Lot-et-Garonne department in south-western France. The town is known for being the site of the pseudo-apparitions that led to the founding of the dissident Traditionalist Catholic schismatic sectarian group Fraternité Notre-Dame.

See also
Communes of the Lot-et-Garonne department

References

Communes of Lot-et-Garonne